The 2017 Fiji Premier League was the 41st season of the Fiji Premier League (Vodafone Premier League for sponsorship reasons) organized by the Fiji Football Association since its establishment in 1977.

Team changes

To Fiji Premier League

Promoted from 2016 Fiji Super Premier Division
 Rakiraki

From Fiji Premier League

Relegated to 2017 Fiji Super Premier Division
 Nadroga

Teams

Stadiums and locations

Standings

Results

Top scorers

References

Fiji Premier League seasons
Fiji
Premier League